ILIAS ( [German for "Integrated Learning, Information and Work Cooperation System"]) is an open-source web-based learning management system (LMS). It supports learning content management (including SCORM 2004 compliance) and tools for collaboration, communication, evaluation and assessment. The software is published under the GNU General Public License and can be run on any server that supports PHP and MySQL.

History 
ILIAS is one of the first Learning Management Systems to have been used in universities. A prototype had been developed since the end of 1997 under the VIRTUS project at the Faculty of Management, Economics and Social Sciences of the University of Cologne, initiated and organized by Wolfgang Leidhold. On November 2, 1998, version 1 of the LMS ILIAS was published and offered for learning at the Cologne faculty of business administration, economics and social sciences. Due to increasing interest of other universities, the project team decided to publish ILIAS as open-source software under the GPL in 2000. Between 2002 and 2004, a new ILIAS version was developed from scratch and called "ILIAS 3". In 2004, it became the first open-source LMS to reach full SCORM (Sharable Content Object Reference Model) 1.2 compliance. SCORM 2004 compliance has been reached with version 3.9 as of November 2007.

Concept 
The idea behind ILIAS is to offer a flexible environment for learning and working online with integrated tools. ILIAS goes far beyond the idea of learning being confined to courses as a lot of other LMS do. ILIAS can rather be seen as a type of library providing learning and working materials and contents at any location of the repository. This offers the possibility to run ILIAS not as a locked warehouse but as an open knowledge platform where content might be made available for non-registered users too.

Features 
ILIAS offers a lot of features to design and run online-courses, create learning content, offer assessments and exercises, run surveys and support communication and cooperation among users.

Personal Desktop 
A general characteristic of ILIAS is the concept of Personal Desktop and Repository. While the Repository contains all content, courses and other materials structured in categories and described by metadata, the Personal Desktop is the individual workspace of each learner, author, tutor and administrator. The Personal Desktop contains selected items from the repository (e.g. currently visited courses or an interesting forum) as well as certain tools like mail, tagging, a calendar and also e-portfolio and personal blogs.

 Listing of selected courses, groups and learning resources
 Personal profile and settings like password and system language
 Bookmark Management
 Personal Notes
 External Web Feeds
 Internal News
 Personal Workspace
 Blogs
 e-Portfolio
 Calendar
 Internal Mail
 Personal Learning Progress

Learning Content Management 
Another important characteristic of ILIAS is the repository. All learning content but also forums or chat rooms, tests and surveys, as well as plugged in virtual classrooms or other external tools are created, offered and administrated in the repository and its categories. Therefore, it is not necessary to build up courses for offering learning content. ILIAS could also be used like a kind of knowledge base or website. Access to all repository item is granted by the role-based access control (RBAC) of ILIAS. The repository is structured as tree with a root node and multiple levels. Each repository item is assigned to one node in the RBAC tree.

ILIAS offers four kinds of container for delivering content:
 Categories
 Courses incl. member administration
 Groups incl. member administration
 Folders (within courses and groups)

Container objects can be extended by using the page editor for adding text, images or videos to the page.

All content objects are handled as references. They can be moved, copied or linked into other branches of the repository tree. A file that has already been uploaded can be linked multiple times in different courses and categories without being uploaded a second time.

Course Management 
 Enrollment Settings
 Learning Resource Management
 Time triggered/Conditional Access
 Learning Progress Tracking for Members
 Member Gallery and (Google) Map
 Course News and Announcements

Cooperation 
 Group Management
 Awareness Feature (who is online?)
 vCard Export
 File Sharing
 Wiki

Communication 
 Internal Messaging
 Chat
 Forum
 Podcasting
 Etherpad / Edupad plugin

Test/Assessment 
 Question Types: Multiple choice, fill-in-the-blanks, numerical, matching, ordering, hot spot, essay
 Question Pools for re-using questions in different tests
 Randomization of questions and choices
 IMS-QTI Import and Export
 Online exams
 Learning progress control

Evaluation 
 Personalised and anonymous surveys
 Question types: Multiple choice, matrix, open answer
 Pools for question administration and re-use
 Online report analysis
 CSV and excel export of survey results

Learning Content / Authoring 
 XML-based learning document format, exports to HTML, XML and SCORM
 SCORM 1.2 (Certified for SCORM-Conformance Level LMS-RTE3)
 SCORM 2004 (Certified as LMS for SCORM 2004 3rd Edition)
 AICC
 OpenOffice.org and LibreOffice Import Tool (eLAIX)
 LaTeX-Support
 HTML Site Import
 Wiki
 File Management (all formats)

Administration 
 Role administration (global roles, local roles, role templates)
 User administration
 Authentication CAS, LDAP, SOAP, RADIUS and Shibboleth
 Individual layout templates / skins
 Support for multiple clients
 PayPal payment
 Didactic templates
 Statistics and learning progress administration
 SOAP Interface

References

External links

Bibliography 
 Matthias Kunkel: Das offizielle ILIAS 4-Praxisbuch: Gemeinsam online lernen, arbeiten und kommunizieren. 1. Auflage. Addison-Wesley, München 2011, .

Assistive technology
Cross-platform software
Free content management systems
Free educational software
Free learning management systems
Free learning support software
Free software programmed in PHP
Learning management systems
Virtual learning environments